Joel Frahm (born 1970) is an American jazz saxophonist.

Early life
Frahm was born in Racine, Wisconsin, in 1970. He attended the Stephen Bull Fine Arts School, where he began playing the tenor saxophone. At the age of 15 he and his family moved to West Hartford, Connecticut, where he attended William H. Hall High School. He met pianist Brad Mehldau at school, and the two had weekly gigs locally. "After leaving high school in 1988, Frahm attended Rutgers University for a year before transferring to The Manhattan School of Music, and following graduation with a Bachelor of Arts degree in Jazz Performance he entered Betty Carter's Jazz Ahead workshop."

Frahm lists saxophonists John Coltrane, Stan Getz and Chris Potter as influences.

Later life and career
His debut recording as a leader was Sorry, No Decaf, for Palmetto Records, in 1998. A 2001 recording, Don't Explain, was a series of duets with Mehldau.

Discography

As leader/co-leader
Sorry, No Decaf (Palmetto, 1998)
The Navigator (Palmetto, 2000)
Don't Explain (Palmetto, 2001)
We Used to Dance (Anzic, 2005)
With Bruce Katz, Project A. (Anzic, 2009)
Caminhos Cruzados (Venus, 2010)
Live at Smalls (Smallslive, 2011)
With Pavel Wlosok Trio, Czechmate (New Port Line, 2013)
With Johannes Mössinger, New by Two (Unit, 2017)

As sideman
With Omer Avital

 New Song (2014)

With Brad Mehldau
Finding Gabriel (Nonesuch, 2019)
 Jacob's Ladder (Nonesuch, 2020–2021)

As invited soloist
With Sant Andreu Jazz Band, Barcelona
Jazzing 6 Vol. 1+2, Temps (2016))

References

Notes

Further reading
Saxshed interview

External links
Official website

Living people
American jazz soprano saxophonists
American jazz tenor saxophonists
American male saxophonists
Crossover jazz saxophonists
Jazz fusion saxophonists
Palmetto Records artists
1970 births
21st-century American saxophonists
21st-century American male musicians
American male jazz musicians
Hall High School (Connecticut) alumni